Ženski rokometni klub Velenje or simply ŽRK Velenje is a women's handball club from Velenje, Slovenia. The club play their home games at Red Hall, a 2,500 capacity multi-purpose sports venue in Velenje.

Handball clubs established in 1969
Slovenian handball clubs
Sport in Velenje
1969 establishments in Yugoslavia